By Heart is the third studio album by Australian band Matt Finish. The album produced the singles "Blue" and "Earthbound (Don't Sing for Me)".

Track listing
 "Blue"
 "Earthbound (Don't Sing for Me)"
 "Understand"
 "I Could Tell You I Cried"
 "Magic"
 "By Heart"
 "Love in Demand"
 "Need You Near Me"
 "Silence"
 "In My Dreams"

Personnel 
Matt Moffitt - vocals, guitar
Paul Dawkins - keyboards, vocals
Rohan Cannon - guitar, vocals
Bobby Christian - bass
Adrian Cannon - drums

1993 albums
Matt Finish albums